The Tehoi-class (テホイ) locomotives were a class of steam tender locomotives of the Chosen Government Railway (Sentetsu) with 4-6-0 wheel arrangement. The "Teho" name came from the American naming system for steam locomotives, under which locomotives with 4-6-0 wheel arrangement were called "Ten Wheeler".

After the Liberation of Korea, of the 178 surviving locomotives of all Teho classes - including six previously owned by private railway companies - 106 went to the Korean National Railroad in the South, and 72 to the Korean State Railway in the North.

Description
The テホイ (Tehoi) class was a class of six 4-6-0 Vauclain compound locomotives for mainline use built by the Baldwin Locomotive Works of the United States in 1906, originally for the Gyeongbu Railway, and later operated by the Chosen Government Railway.

Gyeongbu Railway 300 series
Needing more locomotives for medium-duty passenger operations on both trunk and branch lines, the Gyeongbu Railway once again turned to Baldwin of the United States, ordering a total of twelve 4-6-0 tender locomotives in 1906. Six of these were two-cylinder Vauclain compounds and the other six were single-cylinder locomotives, which were delivered in knockdown form and assembled at the railway's shops in Busan. Numbered 301–306, they were not long in operation with the Gyeongbu Railway, as the company was nationalised in July 1906 and folded into the newly formed National Railway, which became Sentetsu in 1910, in September of that year.

Chosen Government Railway テホイ (Tehoi) class
After being taken over by Sentetsu, they were put to use on mainline passenger trains, but as more powerful types were introduced, they were gradually relegated to branchline duties and freight trains. In 1918 they were renumbered 601–606, and in 1929 they were rebuilt with superheaters. In Sentetsu's general renumbering of 1938, they were designated テホイ (Tehoi) class and numbered テホイ1 through テホイ6.

Postwar
The exact dispersal of the six Tehoi-class locomotives after the partition of Korea in 1945 and the division of Sentetsu assets in 1947 is uncertain, but at least one went to the South, where the Korean National Railroad designated them 터우1 (Teou1) class. Those that went to the North were designated 더우하 (Tŏuha) class by the Korean State Railway.

Construction

References

Locomotives of Korea
Locomotives of South Korea
Locomotives of North Korea
Railway locomotives introduced in 1906
4-6-0 locomotives
Baldwin locomotives
Vauclain compound locomotives